Negative logic may refer to:

 Negative logic, a representation of logic level
 Negation

See also
 Logic family